Totally Lost is the fourth album by rock band Young Fresh Fellows.  It was released in 1988 through Frontier Records.

Track listing
All songs written by Scott McCaughey, except where noted.
 Everything's Gonna Turn Out Great
 Failure (McCaughey, Jimmy Silva) 
 The Universal Trendsetter
 Don't Look At My Face You Might See What I Mean
 I'd Say That You Were Upset
 No Help At All
 No One Really Knows
 Little Softy
 I Blew My Stack
 Take My Brain Away (McCaughey, Tad Hutchison) 
 Celebration
 Picky Piggy
 Totally Lost (Complete Version)
 You're Not Supposed To Laugh
 World Tour '88

References

The Young Fresh Fellows albums
1988 albums
Frontier Records albums
Albums produced by Conrad Uno